The siege of Stralsund was a battle during the Great Northern War. The Swedish Empire defended her Swedish Pomeranian port of Stralsund against a coalition of Denmark-Norway, the Electorate of Saxony and the Tsardom of Russia, which was joined by the Kingdom of Prussia during the siege.

A first attempt to take Stralsund was made in 1711, when the allies closed in on the town. Swedish relief forced the coalition to withdraw from the fortifications, whereupon the besieging armies drew a wider ring along the lines of the Recknitz and Peene rivers. Magnus Stenbock's victory at Gadebusch for a short time distracted the allies, but after Stenbock's pursuit and subsequent defeat, Prussia as well as Hanover, ruled in personal union with Great Britain, joined the anti-Swedish alliance.

The allies agreed that Denmark should cede her claims to Bremen-Verden to Hanover, and in turn Denmark was promised the northern parts of Swedish Pomerania with Stralsund, while the southern parts were to become Prussian. In 1714, Charles XII of Sweden rode to Stralsund from his Turkish exile to lead the defense in person. From 12 July to 24 December 1715, the allies sieged the town and eventually forced its surrender. Charles XII escaped to Sweden.

Stralsund remained under Danish control until it was returned to Sweden by the Treaty of Frederiksborg.

Prelude
In Poltava, the Swedish Empire lost the initiative in the Great Northern War. With Charles XII of Sweden's main army destroyed, the anti-Swedish alliance of the Tsardom of Russia, Denmark-Norway and Saxe-Poland-Lithuania re-constituted in the Treaty of Thorn and the Treaty of Copenhagen, the Swedish king exiled to Bender and Sweden's provinces of Finland and Livonia invaded, the Swedish defense relied on 11,800 soldiers garrisoned in northern Germany, and an army of 10,000 men in Greater Poland commanded by Ernst Detlof von Krassow. The latter was in full retreat, harassed by Saxon forces and a plague that had broken out in Poland.

The Swedish government issued mobilization orders for Swedish Pomerania on 8 April 1711. 3,800 men aged between twenty and forty years were to be drawn to serve a five years term. Stralsund had recovered from the destruction of 1678, but in 1711, the plague carried to Pomerania with the retreating Swedish forces of the Krassow corps caused thousands of deaths. The Swedes were pursued by the armies of the anti-Swedish coalition, who reached and laid siege to Stralsund in 1711.

This pursuit through formerly neutral Reich territory was made possible by the death of emperor Joseph I in April: until Joseph I's successor Charles VI was inaugurated, the imperial constitution ruled that August the Strong, one of the constituents of the anti-Swedish coalition, was in charge of northern Germany's imperial affairs. Thus, when the Swedish forces withdrew to their fortified strongholds of Stralsund, Stettin (Szczecin) and Wismar, 6,000 Saxons, 6,000 Poles, and 12,000 Russians were able to follow up from the southeast. Another 25,000 Danes moved into the empire via Holstein-Gottorp, and approached Stralsund from the west.

Siege

A Swedish relief force under Magnus Stenbock's command with a strength of 6,000 to 10,000 men landed on Rügen on 25 September 1711, whereupon the Danish-Saxon-Russian siege army withdrew to the Recknitz and Peene rivers. Instead of a launching another major assault on the town, the allies were content with minor raids and skirmishes into the pocket in the following years. Swedish general Carl Gustaf Dücker requested reinforcements, and in May 1712 was supplied with an additional 6,391 foot and 4,800 horse from Sweden. Also, Dücker concentrated all Swedish forces scattered in Pomeranian garrisons, another 8,000 men, in Stralsund, while the allied strength was about 23,000 men.

At this time, Frederik IV of Denmark-Norway was not interested in annexing Stralsund to his empire. When he re-entered the war in 1709, Frederik had promised to not attack Swedish territories in the Holy Roman Empire and protect their citizens wherever they pledge loyalty to him. Accordingly, Frederik IV had agreed in a convention of 1711 that Stralsund along with northern Swedish Pomerania should be annexed by August the Strong, elector of Saxony and king of Poland-Lithuania. However, after George I of Brunswick-Lüneburg (Hanover) ascended the throne of Great Britain, who had dropped out of the War of Spanish Succession in the Peace of Utrecht in 1713 and was thus free to enter the anti-Swedish alliance in the Great Northern War, Frederik IV changed his mind. Already in 1712, Denmark and Hanover had invaded and partitioned Bremen-Verden.

The Stralsund area had been tied to Denmark in the Late Middle Ages, was of strategic importance as a bridgehead into the Holy Roman Empire, and a potent exporter of wool and grain. First Danish claims to northern Swedish Pomerania were formulated in 1713, and a respective treaty was drafted in May 1715 between Frederick IV and George I which guaranteed the Danish occupied Swedish dominion of Bremen-Verden to George I in return for him entering the war on Frederik's side, and Pomerania north of the Peene river as well as 30,000 talers to Frederik IV. When Prussia, keen to annex Swedish Pomerania as well, joined the allies in summer, a Dano-Prussian treaty was concluded partitioning Swedish Pomerania along the Peene, with Denmark being assured her claims for the northern part with Stralsund, and Prussia for the southern part with Stettin. August the Strong's protests and Danish tendencies to minimize their military efforts in the coalition after the treaty, resulting from Frederik IV's understanding that he now would gain Stralsund anyway, led to quarrels in the siege force.

Stenbock's forces turned west with 16,000 men to face the allies at Gadebusch, leaving 3,000 men to garrison Stralsund. Their victory and subsequent westward movement distracted the allies from the siege, yet when Stenbock burned down Danish Altona, Russian forces burned Swedish Pomeranian Wolgast east of Stralsund in revenge in 1713. The allies were free to concentrate on Stralsund again after Stenbock's forces, pursued by 36,000 Poles, Russians and Saxons, were defeated in the Battle of Tönning on 16 May 1713. Before re-joining with the siege army near Stralsund, Russian forces under Alexander Menshikov's command and a Saxon engineer corps were deployed from Tönning to Stettin, the second major Swedish fortress in Pomerania, and captured it on 29 September 1713. However, Russian tsar Peter the Great had to withdraw his forces from the Holy Roman Empire by the terms of the Treaty of Adrianople, concluded on 25 June 1713 as a consequence of the Pruth Campaign.

Charles XII of Sweden, exiled to Bender in the Ottoman Empire between the Surrender at Perevolochna and his return in 1714, had envisioned that Stralsund would constitute the base of a renewed Swedish attack on Peter the Great. Charles XII's plans foresaw a two-fold assault of a Swedish army from Pomerania and a Turkish army from the South. When Charles XII reached Stralsund in November 1714, the town's garrison was reinforced to a strength of 17,000 men. Searching for allies, Charles XII also negotiated with Prussia, but was unwilling to meet Frederick William I's demands on Stettin and 400,000 reichstalers in tribute. In April 1715, Königsberg declared war.

Though George I was not involved in the war as the king of Great Britain, but merely as the duke of Hanover, the Danish navy was assisted in the siege by eight British vessels, detached by British admiral John Norris, who was ordered to guard the Maritime Powers' merchants in the Baltic Sea. In July, the allied forces closed in on Stralsund from the landside, and in November a combined Danish-Saxon-Prussian army landed at Groß Stresow and took the island of Rügen north of the town. When defeat became inevitable, Charles XII escaped and the defenders surrendered on Christmas Eve. Stralsund became the capital of Danish Pomerania.

Aftermath
After Stralsund's surrender, a Danish administration under commander von Stöcken was set up, and 1028 Swedish prisoners of war were detained in the town. Yet, many noble and burgher families - Pomeranian, Swedish or intermarried - remained loyal to Sweden. The Danish government reacted by prohibiting contacts to Sweden and obliging the landowners to pledge allegiance, otherwise, they would be stripped of their lands or expelled. As a consequence, an unknown number emigrated to Sweden, including Swedish prisoners of war who were able to escape with the help of the local population. Of sixty-nine high ranking Swedish officials and officers detained in Stralsund in January 1716, only thirty-one were still in town in March of the following year. When the local population continued to maintain close contacts with Sweden and aid Swedish refugees, Danish guards started to patrol the coast and investigate the traffic with Sweden, before this traffic was prohibited altogether until 1719. Since only a few nobles had pledged allegiance to Frederik IV in August 1716, the Danish government issued a deadline, and in October started to expropriate those who had not given the oath to the Danish king.

Also in 1716, Swedish Wismar surrendered to the allies, eliminating Sweden's last stronghold on the southern Baltic coast. By the end of the war however, Stralsund was restored to Sweden.

The siege of Stralsund marked the beginning of a friendship between Frederick William I of Prussia and Huguenot refugee Jacques Egide Duhan de Jandun, whom he first met when he was in the service of field marshal Alexander von Dohna in 1715. In the following year, Frederick William I entrusted Duhan den Jandun with the raising of his then four-year-old son, later known as Frederick the Great.

Notes

Sources

References

Bibliography

External links

Conflicts in 1715
Stralsund 1715
Stralsund 1715
Stralsund 1715
Stralsund 1715
Stralsund
1715 in Denmark
1715 in the Holy Roman Empire
Battles in Mecklenburg-Western Pomerania
Swedish Pomerania